William O'Brien (1852–1928) was an Irish journalist and politician.

William O'Brien may also refer to:

Other politicians
William O'Brien, 2nd Earl of Inchiquin (c. 1640–1692), Governor of Jamaica
William O'Brien (Australian politician) (1882–1953), New South Wales politician
William O'Brien (Fine Gael politician) (1918–1994), Irish Fine Gael TD and Senator from County Limerick
William O'Brien (Minnesota politician) (1930–2007), American politician
William O'Brien (Nova Scotia politician) (1782–1854), political figure in Nova Scotia
William O'Brien (Rhode Island politician) (born 1969), American state legislator in Rhode Island
William O'Brien (trade unionist) (1881–1968), Irish Labour TD and trade union leader
William Edward O'Brien (1831–1914), lawyer, farmer, editor and political figure in Ontario, Canada
William H. O'Brien (1871–?), Wisconsin state assemblyman
William J. O'Brien (politician) (1836–1905), United States Representative from Maryland, 1873–1877
William L. O'Brien (born 1951), former Speaker of the New Hampshire House of Representatives
William Smith O'Brien (1803–1864), Irish Conservative and Repeal MP and Young Ireland revolutionary
William Smith O'Brien (American politician) (1862–1948), U.S. Representative from West Virginia
Bill O'Brien (British politician) (born 1929), British Labour MP for Normanton, 1983–2005
Billy O'Brien (politician) (1929–2012), American politician in the Virginia House of Delegates

In sports
William O'Brien (American football) (1923–2000), head football coach for the Southern Illinois Salukis
William O'Brien (footballer), Scottish footballer
William O'Brien (racing driver) (born 1951), American racing driver
Parry O'Brien (William Patrick O'Brien, 1932–2007), American shot-put innovator
William O'Brien, National League baseball umpire in 1876
Willie O'Brien (born 1929), English footballer
Bill O'Brien (American football) (born 1969), American football coach
Bill O'Brien (footballer, born 1877) (1877–1942), Australian rules footballer for Collingwood
Bill O'Brien (footballer, born 1887) (1887–1943), Australian rules footballer for St Kilda
Bill O'Brien (footballer, born 1905) (1905–1988), Australian rules footballer for South Melbourne
 Billy O'Brien (baseball) (1860–1911), Major League Baseball first baseman
 Billy O'Brien (footballer) (born 1995), Welsh football goalkeeper

Others
William O'Brien, 2nd Marquess of Thomond (1765–1846), Irish peer
William O'Brien, 3rd Earl of Inchiquin (1662–1719), Irish peer
William O'Brien, 4th Earl of Inchiquin (1700–1777), founder of the Royal Cork Yacht Club in 1720
William O'Brien (actor) (1740–?), Irish actor in the company of David Garrick at Drury Lane
William O'Brien (judge) (1832–1899), Irish judge
William O'Brien (police officer) (1944–2016), American police officer
William O'Brien (Royal Navy officer) (1916–2016), British admiral
William O'Brien, President, BATS Global Markets
Monsignor William B. O'Brien, founder and the president of the World Federation of Therapeutic Communities also co-founder of Daytop 
William David O'Brien (1878–1962), auxiliary bishop of Chicago, Illinois, USA
William J. O'Brien (Medal of Honor) (1899–1944), United States Army officer during World War II
William J. O'Brien, inventor of the Decca Navigator System
William S. O'Brien (1825–1878), American businessman 
Bill O'Brien (actor), Director of Theatre and Musical Theatre for the National Endowment for the Arts; actor
Tim O'Brien (author) (William Timothy O'Brien, born 1946), American author
Billy Porter (criminal) (William O'Brien, 1850–?), American burglar and underworld figure in New York City
William O'Brien (archaeologist), Irish professor of archaeology in University College Cork.

Things 
 SS William O'Brien, steam cargo ship built in 1914–1915 by New York Shipbuilding Company of Camden, foundered in April 1920

See also
Will O'Brien, a character in the TV series Mile High
William O'Bryan (1778-1868), English preacher